The marsh seedeater (Sporophila palustris) is a species of bird in the family Thraupidae. It is sexually dichromic, with the males sporting a bright white throat, grey crown and chestnut belly, and the females resembling other brown female seedeaters.

It is found in Argentina, Brazil, Paraguay, and Uruguay. It is migratory, breeding in wet grasslands and marshes around Uruguay and Argentina and migrating northwards in the austral winter to wet and dry grasslands in southern Brazil.

It is threatened by habitat loss, trapping for the pet trade, and pesticides. It is currently protected across most of its range and several protected areas may help safeguard this species.

The Entre Ríos seedeater

A rare seedeater very similar to this species breeds in the Entre Ríos province of Argentina, and a few individuals have been found in Corrientes province and in southern Brazil, eastern Paraguay, and southeastern Uruguay.  It has been listed as a separate species, Sporophila zelichi (Narosky 1977), the Entre Ríos, white-collared, Zelich's, or Narosky's seedeater.  Differences are that it has a wide white collar all the way around the neck; the back is chestnut, not grey; and the rufous of the belly is darker than the marsh seedeater's.  However, its status has been controversial since its discovery; some have suggested that it is a color morph of the marsh seedeater or the chestnut seedeater, or a hybrid between the two.  The few recorded songs are the same as those of the marsh seedeater.  Accordingly, the American Ornithologists' Union's South American Classification Committee voted in 2008 to remove S. zelichi from their list, with two voters favoring the suggestion that it is a morph of the marsh seedeater.  Following them, it is considered to belong to the marsh seedeater here.

Its natural habitats are subtropical or tropical dry lowland grassland and subtropical or tropical seasonally wet or flooded lowland grassland. It is threatened by habitat loss.

If zelichi is a separate species, it is critically endangered.

References
 BirdLife International (2007). Species factsheet: Sporophila palustris. Downloaded from http://www.birdlife.org on 29/4/2008

marsh seedeater
Birds of Argentina
Birds of Uruguay
marsh seedeater
marsh seedeater
Taxonomy articles created by Polbot